Covenant marriage is a legally distinct kind of marriage in three states (Arizona, Arkansas, and Louisiana) of the United States, in which the marrying spouses agree to obtain pre-marital counseling and accept more limited grounds for later seeking divorce (the least strict of which being that the couple lives apart from each other for two years). Louisiana became the first state to pass a covenant marriage law in 1997; shortly afterwards, Arkansas and Arizona followed suit. Since its inception, very few couples in those states have married under covenant marriage law.

As of the nationwide legalization of same-sex marriage, covenant marriages now can be contracted by either opposite- or same-sex couples.

Procedure
Prior to entering into a covenant marriage, a couple must attend premarital counseling sessions "emphasizing the nature, purposes, and responsibilities of marriage" and must sign a statement declaring "that a covenant marriage is for life." In contrast to no-fault divorce's more lenient requirements for non-covenant marriages, a spouse in a covenant marriage desiring a divorce may first be required to attend marital counseling. A spouse desiring a divorce must also prove that one of the following is true:
 The other spouse has committed adultery.
 The other spouse has committed a felony.
 The other spouse engages in substance abuse.
 The other spouse has physically or sexually abused the spouse or a child.
 The spouses have been living separately for a minimum amount of time specified by law (one or two years, depending on the law of the state).

Couples married without a covenant marriage may also accept the obligations of a covenant marriage at a later date.

Intent and acceptance 
According to proponents of covenant marriage, the movement sets out to promote and strengthen marriages, reduce the rate of divorce, lessen the number of children born out of wedlock, discourage cohabitation, and frame marriage as an honorable and desirable institution.

Despite the goals of covenant marriage proponents, in the three states with covenant marriage statutes, only an extremely small minority of newlyweds has chosen covenant marriage.  In Louisiana, between 2000 and 2010, only about 1 percent of marrying couples chose a covenant marriage, with the other 99 percent choosing to marry under standard marriage laws permitting no-fault divorce. In Arizona, estimates of the rate of covenant marriage among new couples range from 0.25 percent to 1 percent.  In Arkansas, a similarly very small number of couples choose covenant marriage.

Out of state divorce 
A number of legal analyses suggest that states are likely to apply local state divorce law when a resident seeks a divorce, or when both members of a marriage agree to seek a divorce. This potentially renders covenant marriage's divorce restrictions ineffective if one individual establishes residency in a state without a covenant marriage law, or if both individuals go to such a state for an uncontested divorce.

Reception
Critics of covenant marriage have described it "as an example of religion harnessing state power"  and creating roadblocks to no-fault divorce that "could easily exacerbate" a bad family "situation and harm kids."  According to these critics, "[w]aiting periods and mandatory classes 'add a new frustration to already frustrated lives'" and are merely "a form of paternalism – expanding government in pursuit of socially conservative ends."

Covenant marriage law is technically written neutrally with respect to religion, however many view covenant marriage law as government permitting a religious form of marriage, particularly due to its historical background.  Indeed, Katherine Spaht, a founder of the Louisiana Family Forum, and a proponent of Louisiana's covenant marriage law, stated that “[a]nother less obvious objective of the legislation, which is reflected in who may perform the mandatory premarital counseling, is to revitalize and reinvigorate the 'community' known as the church.  Reinvigoration results from inviting religion back 'into the public square' ...."  Tony Perkins, a sponsor of the Louisiana Covenant Marriage Bill and another founder of the Louisiana Family Forum, described covenant marriage as fostering an environment for "traditional family values" that are "up to the faith community."

See also
 Types of marriages
 Manus marriage

References

Types of marriage
Church and state law in the United States
Arizona law
Arkansas law
Louisiana law
Marriage in the United States